This is the doubles draw for the second Bendigo Women's International of 2013.

Monique Adamczak and Olivia Rogowska won the tournament, defeating Stephanie Bengson and Sally Peers in the all-Australian final, 6–3, 2–6, [11–9].

Seeds

Draw

References 
 Draw

Bendigo Women's International 2 - Doubles